Have a Bad Day is an album by American art rock band The Residents, released in 1996. This CD features some of the soundtrack music from the CD-ROM Bad Day on the Midway, also by The Residents.

CD track listing
 "Bad Day on the Midway"
 "Dagmar, the Dog Woman"
 "I Ain't Seen No Rats"
 "Tears of the Taxman"
 "God's Teardrops"
 "The Seven Tattoos"
 "The Marvels of Mayhem"
 "Lottie the Human Log"
 "Ugly Liberation"
 "Daddy's Poems"
 "The Red Head of Death"
 "Timmy"

The Residents albums
1996 albums